“One of the Living” is a 1985 song by American singer Tina Turner featuring Device and Tim Cappello. It was one of two songs which Turner recorded for the film Mad Max Beyond Thunderdome, in which she also starred (“We Don't Need Another Hero (Thunderdome)” was the other). The single reached number 15 on the American Billboard Hot 100. Along with performing keyboards and backing vocals, Holly Knight wrote and composed the song. Knight also co-wrote Turner's singles "The Best" and "Better Be Good to Me." Gene Black performed guitars and backing vocals. Mike Chapman produced the song. The saxophone solo was performed by Tim Cappello and lead vocals were performed by Tina Turner. Device lead singer, Paul Engemann did not participate on the project. In 1986, the song won the Grammy Award for Best Female Rock Vocal Performance.

Versions and remixes
 Album Version - 5:59
 7" Remix - 4:10
 7" Dub Version - 4:45
 12" Special Club Mix - 7:35
 12" Dub - 4:56
 12" Instrumental - 5:58

Charts

References

Tina Turner songs
1985 singles
1985 songs
Songs written by Holly Knight
Mad Max music
Grammy Award for Best Female Rock Vocal Performance
Song recordings produced by Mike Chapman
Capitol Records singles
Songs written for films
American hard rock songs